Twiggs may refer to:

In ships:
USS Twiggs (DD-127), a US Navy destroyer during World War I
USS Twiggs (DD-591), a US Navy destroyer during World War II

Geography
 Twiggs County, Georgia
Twiggs, West Virginia

People with the surname Twiggs:
 David E. Twiggs (1790–1862), US soldier during the War of 1812 and Mexican War, and a general in the Confederate States Army during the American Civil War
 John Twiggs (1750–1816), leader in the Georgia Militia during the American Revolutionary War
 Levi Twiggs (1793–1847), officer in the US Marine Corps during the War of 1812, the Seminole Wars and the Mexican–American War
 Sarah Lowe Twiggs (1839-1920), American poet

See also
 Twigg